Michael 'Monster' Mison (born 8 November 1975) is an English former professional footballer who played as a midfielder. He played in the Football League with Fulham, before dropping into non-League football with Rushden & Diamonds, St Albans City and Sutton United.

Career
Mison started his career with Fulham where he made a total of 73 appearances, scoring seven goals in all competitions. He then dropped into non-League football moving to Conference National club Rushden & Diamonds in 1997, and onto St Albans City and Sutton United in 2001.

References

External links

 Profile at rdfc1992.com

1975 births
Living people
English footballers
English Football League players
National League (English football) players
Fulham F.C. players
Rushden & Diamonds F.C. players
St Albans City F.C. players
Sutton United F.C. players
Association football midfielders